Johann Wilhelm Krause (19 June 1757 – 22 August 1828) was a Baltic German architect. His most notable work was the designing of main building of Tartu University.

He was born in Dittmannsdorf, Germany.

Before 1787 he was in the military service of England. In 1787 he came to Livonia and started to work as a home teacher. In 1803 he was chosen to the professor at the University of Tartu. During the Tartu period he designed several buildings in Tartu.

He died in Tartu.

Works
 1803-1809 main building of Tartu University
 Old Anatomical Theatre (1803–1805 its central part, and 1825–1827 its wings)
 1804-1807 restructuring of the ruins of Tartu Cathedral into the Tartu University Library.

References

Further reading
 Tartu Ülikool ja tema arhitekt Johann Wilhelm Krause – University of Tartu and its Architect Johann Wilhelm Krause; Juhan Maiste, Kadi Polli, Mariann Raisma; Tallinn: Eesti Keele Sihtasutus, 2003

External links

1757 births
1828 deaths
Baltic-German people
Academic staff of the University of Tartu
German architects
People from Wałbrzych County